Elham railway station is a disused railway station on the Elham Valley Railway which served the village of Elham in Kent and the surrounding villages. Situated to the east of Elham the clapboard station was opened in 1887. In 1931 the line was singled and one platform was closed. Regular passenger services were withdrawn on 1 December 1940 when the line was taken over for military use. In 1946 the line was reopened for goods traffic but a year later this service ceased when the station was officially closed. After closure the station building was demolished but one platform still exists forming a retaining wall of a garden for a house now built on the station site.

History

It was controlled by a ground frame. Initially, there were six passenger trains per day. By 1906 there were nine trains a day, with five on Sunday. The service had been reduced to eight trains a day by 1922 and five trains a day by 1937.

Two rail-mounted 12-inch howitzers were stationed at Elham during the war. The track had to be strengthened to cope with the recoil when the guns were fired. The station remained open to freight during the war. Military control was relinquished on 19 February 1945. The Elham Valley Railway closed on 1 October 1947. The station building was demolished in 1964.

References 
citations

Sources

External links
 Station on 1947 OS Map

Disused railway stations in Kent
Former South Eastern Railway (UK) stations
Railway stations in Great Britain opened in 1887
Railway stations in Great Britain closed in 1940
1887 establishments in England
1940 disestablishments in England